Charivari was a chain of clothing stores in New York City. Its first store opened in 1967 and had grown to six stores before finally closing in 1998. It is known for championing avant-garde fashion designers in the 1980s. Its rise to prominence in fashion coincided with the gentrification of its neighbourhood, Manhattan's Upper West Side.

History
The Charivari stores were founded by Jon Weiser, his mother Selma and his sister Barbara Weiser in 1967. They ran the stores together. Charivari was the first high-fashion store in the Upper West Side.

In 1976, the men's store relocated across the street. That year, Esquire magazine ran a feature about America's 8 top stores and Charivari was picked for New York. During the 1970s and 1980s the store grew from one to five locations (four were on the Upper West Side, there was a store on West 57 and a sixth location on the Upper East Side was added in 1992). The Upper West Side locations were designed by Alan J. Buchsbaum.

Writing about the closing of the chain in The New Yorker, Rebecca Mead noted: "If, during the nineteen-eighties, you wanted your clothes to indicate that you were a) in the know, fashion wise; b) a bit of an intellectual; and c) not afraid of wearing unfinished seams or jackets turned inside out, or other things that might, if not worn with sufficient élan, look like fashion disasters, then you shopped at Charivari."

The founders attributed the company's decline and eventual failure to poor financial planning, the recession in the 1990s and its own success: the availability of the avant-garde designers championed by Charivari in both the designers' own stores and at larger department stores made a store like Charivari unnecessary.

Activities 
The Charivari stores featured Japanese and European designer wear, including Azzedine Alaïa, Giorgio Armani, Ann Demeulemeester, Dolce & Gabbana, Perry Ellis, Jean Paul Gaultier, Katharine Hamnett, Marc Jacobs (who, as a teenager, worked at Charivari), Helmut Lang, Issey Miyake, Thierry Mugler, Dries van Noten, Prada, Gianni Versace, and Yohji Yamamoto.

References

Clothing brands of the United States
Clothing retailers of the United States
American companies established in 1967
Clothing companies established in 1967
Retail companies established in 1967
Defunct companies based in New York City
Companies based in New York City